Breza is a village and municipality in Námestovo District in the Žilina Region of northern Slovakia.

History
In historical records the village was first mentioned in 1580.

Geography
The municipality lies at an altitude of 668 metres and covers an area of 22.523 km². It has a population of about 1510 people.

References

External links
www.breza.sk
https://web.archive.org/web/20070513023228/http://www.statistics.sk/mosmis/eng/run.html

Villages and municipalities in Námestovo District